Nooran, also spelled Nooraan, is a 1957 Pakistani Punjabi-language musical romance film directed and produced by J.C. Anand and starring Noor Jehan and Sudhir in lead roles. Hazeen Qadri weote the film, songs lyrics and dialogues of the film. The film revolves around Nooran and Sohna Baloch who falls for each other first sight but their families are enemies of each other for many years. Although, the film didn't well at box office but over the years, the film's song became popular and inspired the others, especially that sung by Jehan.

Cast
 Noor Jahan
 Sudhir
 Zeenat
 Nazar
 Saleem Raza
 M. Ajmal
 Kamla
 G.N. Butt
 Rakhshi
 Maya Devi
 Ismael Qamar
 Rangeela
 Afzal Beg
 Saeed Akhtar
 Nighat Sultana (guest appearance)

Production
The film was made in Lahore by Ever-ready Pictures. It was produced by J.C Anand, directed by M.A Khan, story/lyrics by Hazin Qadri, and music composed by Safdar Hussain.

Music 
Safdar Hussain composed the music, and playback singers were Noor Jehan, Iqbal Bano and Munir Hussain

Track list:

""
"" 
""
""
""
""
""
""
""

References

External links
 Nooran (1957 film) on IMDb website

1957 films
Punjabi-language Pakistani films
Pakistani black-and-white films
1950s Punjabi-language films